Immutatus is a monotypic genus of potter wasps from Madagascar. The sole species is Immutatus sakalavus.

References

Potter wasps
Monotypic Hymenoptera genera